The Sahrawi People's Liberation Army, (SPLA; also romanized as Saharawi; often abbreviated as ELPS or ELP from the ), is the army of the Sahrawi Arab Democratic Republic (SADR) and previously served as the armed wing of the Polisario Front prior to the foundation of the Republic. Its commander-in-chief was the Secretary General of the Polisario, but the army is now also integrated into the SADR government through the SADR Minister of Defence. The SADR and the Polisario Front have no navy or air force. The SPLA's armed units are considered to have a manpower of possibly 20,000–30,000 active soldiers today, but during the war years its strength appears to have increased to 100,000 men. It has a potential manpower of many times that number, since both male and female refugees in the Tindouf camps undergo military training at age 18. Women formed auxiliary units protecting the camps during war years.

Equipment 

When it originally began the Anti-Spanish rebellion, Polisario was forced to capture its weapons individually, and transport them only by foot or camel. But the insurgents multiplied their arsenal and military sophistication after striking an alliance with Algeria in 1975. The modern SPLA is equipped mainly with outdated Russian-manufactured weaponry, donated by Algeria. But its arsenals display a bewildering variety of material, much of it captured from Spanish, Mauritanian (Panhard AMLs) or Moroccan forces (Eland Mk7s, Ratel IFVs, AMX-13s, SK-105 Kürassiers) and made in France, the United States, South Africa, Austria, or Britain. The SPLA has several armored units, composed of old tanks (T-55s, T-62s), somewhat more modern armored cars (EE-9 Cascavels, BRDM-2s), infantry fighting vehicles (BMP-1s, BTR-60s), rocket launchers (BM-21s, BM-30s) and halftracks. Surface-to-air missiles (anti-aircraft missiles, as SA-6s, SA-7s, SA-8s and SA-9s) have downed several Moroccan F-5 fighter jets, and helped compensate for the complete Moroccan control of the skies.

One of the most innovative tactics of the SPLA was its early and extensive use of Land Rovers and other re-modeled civilian vehicles, mounting anti-aircraft machine guns (as ZPU-2 or ZU-23) or anti-tank missiles, (as the AT-3 Sagger) and using them in great numbers, to overwhelm unprepared garrisoned outposts in rapid surprise strikes. This may reflect the movement's difficulties in obtaining original military equipment, but nonetheless proved a powerful tactic.

On 3 November 2005, the Polisario Front signed the Geneva Call, committing itself to a total ban on landmines, and later began to destroy its landmine stockpiles under international supervision. Morocco is one of 40 governments that have not signed the 1997 mine ban treaty. Both parties have used mines extensively in the conflict, but some mine-clearing operations have been carried out under MINURSO supervision since the ceasefire agreement.

Tactics 
The SPLA traditionally employed ghazzi tactics, i.e., motorized surprise raids over great distances, which were inspired by the traditional camel-back war parties of the Sahrawi tribes. However, after the construction of the Moroccan Wall this changed into tactics more resembling conventional warfare, with a focus on artillery, snipers and other long-range attacks. In both phases of the war, SPLA units relied on superior knowledge of the terrain, speed and surprise, and on the ability to retain experienced fighters.

Gallery

References

Military of Western Sahara
Sahrawi Arab Democratic Republic
1976 establishments in Western Sahara
Military units and formations established in 1976
Sahrawi
Sahrawi rebels